Muziris Beach (also known as Munambam Beach) is situated at the north end of Vypin Island in Ernakulam.

References

Beaches of Kerala